Salamander was launched at Blythe in 1806. She traded as a coaster on the west coast of England and then to the Baltic. She was wrecked on the Swedish coast in 1823.

Career
She first appeared in the registers in 1809 in the Register of Shipping (RS) with Lawson, master, H.Debord, owner, and trade Shields coaster.

A gale on 10 November 1810 drove Salamander, "of Blythe", and a number of other vessels onshore on the coast of Lincolnshire between Tetney and Theddlethorpe. She underwent a thorough repair in 1811. She first entered Lloyd's Register (LR) in 1812.

Fate
Salamander  was lost on 25 August 1823 off "Kole", Sweden. Her crew were rescued. She was on a voyage from Saint Petersburg, Russian Empire to London. Her crew, most of her cargo, and her materials were saved. Her entry in Lloyd's Register for 1824 carried the annotation "lost".

Citations

1806 ships
Age of Sail merchant ships of England
Maritime incidents in 1810
Maritime incidents in August 1823